Néstor Gabriel Garza (born 24 November 1976) is a Mexican professional boxer in the Light Welterweight division. He is a former Mexican National, WBO NABO, and the WBA World Super Bantamweight Champion.

Professional career
In 1996 he won the Mexican National Championship by beating Jorge Munoz in Reynosa, Tamaulipas. In December 1997, he upset Cruz Carbajal to win the WBO NABO Super Bantamweight title.

WBA Super Bantamweight Championship
On December 12, 1998 Estrada won the WBA Super Bantamweight title by beating fellow Mexican Enrique Sánchez over twelve rounds in Indio, California.

See also
List of Mexican boxing world champions

References

External links

Boxers from Tamaulipas
People from Reynosa
World boxing champions
World Boxing Association champions
World super-bantamweight boxing champions
Super-bantamweight boxers
1976 births
Living people
Mexican male boxers